Isocanace is a genus of beach flies in the family Canacidae. All known species are Australasian or Afrotropical.

Species
I. albiceps (Malloch, 1925)
I. australis Mathis, 1982
I. briani Mathis, 1982
I. flava (Canzoneri & Meneghini, 1969)

References

Canacidae
Carnoidea genera